Răcari is a town located in Dâmbovița County, Muntenia, Romania. It administers seven villages: Bălănești, Colacu, Ghergani, Ghimpați, Mavrodin, Săbiești and Stănești. It was declared a town in 2004.

Răcari borders the following communes: Bilciurești and Cojasca to the north, Tărtășești and Ciocănești to the south, Butimanu to the east, and Conțești and Cornățelu to the west.

Notable residents
 Ion Ghica, Prince of Samos (1854–1859) and the 5th Prime Minister of Romania (1866), died in 1897 at his estate in Ghergani.
 Donar Munteanu (1886–1972), a poet, was born in Răcari.

References

Towns in Romania
Populated places in Dâmbovița County
Localities in Muntenia